Marakan (also Romanized as Marākān and Marakān) is a village in Ivughli Rural District, Ivughli District, Khoy County, West Azerbaijan Province, Iran. At the 2006 census, its population was 854, in 198 families.

References 

Populated places in Khoy County